Slitless spectroscopy is astronomical spectroscopy done without a small slit to allow only light from a small region to be diffracted.  It works best in sparsely populated fields, as it spreads each point source out into its spectrum, and crowded fields will be too confused to be useful.  It also faces the problem that for extended sources, nearby emission lines will overlap.

The Crossley telescope utilized a slitless spectrograph that was originally employed by Nicholas Mayall.

The Henry Draper Catalogue, published 1924, contains stellar classifications for hundreds of thousands of stars, based on spectra taken with the objective prism method at Harvard College Observatory.  The work of classification was led initially by Williamina Fleming and later by Annie Jump Cannon, with contributions from many other female astronomers including Florence Cushman.

See also
Fine Guidance Sensor and Near Infrared Imager and Slitless Spectrograph (JWST component)
 Echelle grating

References

Cited sources

 
 

Astronomical spectroscopy